Kpg may refer to:

 Korean Provisional Government, a Korean government-in-exile during the Japanese colonial rule of Korea
 Kapingamarangi language, ISO 639-3 language code kpg
 Kurdish Pride Gang, a gang in the United States
 Kiwi Property Group, a New Zealand company, stock ticker KPG
 Kopargaon railway station, in Ahmednagar district, Maharashtra, India, station code KPG
 Kupang LRT station, in Sengkang, Singapore, LRT station abbreviation KPG

See also
 KPGS, a radio station 
 Cretaceous–Paleogene extinction event, or K–Pg extinction event
 Cretaceous–Paleogene boundary, or K–Pg boundary, a geological signature